Johann Gregor Herold or Johann Gregorius Höroldt (6 August 1696, in Jena – 26 January 1775, in Meissen) was a German painter and porcelain painter.  He was a key early figure in defining the styles of decoration for Meissen porcelain from 1723 onwards. 

He was brought to Meissen in 1720 from the du Paquier Vienna porcelain factory, and in 1723 appointed court painter to Augustus the Strong, though evidently expected to spend most of his time designing and painting for porcelain.  He created designs and painted some pieces himself, as guides for the larger team of painters at the factory.  He specialized in chinoiserie designs, and much enlarged the palette of colours used at Meissen.

Notes

References
Battie, David, ed., Sotheby's Concise Encyclopedia of Porcelain, 1990, Conran Octopus,

Further reading 
 Otto Walcha: Meissner Porzellan. Von den Anfängen bis zur Gegenwart. Dresden: Verlag der Kunst, 1986, 8. Aufl., .
 Ulrich Pietsch: Johann Gregorius Höroldt 1696–1775. Leipzig: Edition Leipzig, 1996, .
 Rainer Rückert: Biographische Daten der Meißener Manufakturisten des 18. Jahrhunderts. München: Bayerisches Nationalmuseum, 1990, .

External links 
 Meißener Porzellan-Sammlung Stiftung Ernst Schneider in Schloss Lustheim

1696 births
1775 deaths
German male painters
Porcelain painters